Terence Kona Hislop (born 21 December 1970) is an English footballer who played as a midfielder for Livingston.

Playing career
He studied at Howard University, Washington, D.C. and played football for Howard Bison.

Hislop began his professional career playing at Livingston and made 4 appearances for Livi, scoring one goal.  

The winger signed for Hartlepool United in 1996 and appeared 27 times. It was to be his only season for the club, before leaving in the summer of 1997.

He signed for Blyth Spartans after his departure from Victoria Park.

Personal life
Kona is the brother of former Newcastle United and Trinidad and Tobago goalkeeper, Shaka Hislop, and the cousin of American sprinter Natasha Hastings.

References

External links
Kona Hislop on Soccerbase

1970 births
Living people
English footballers
Scottish Football League players
English Football League players
Association football midfielders
Livingston F.C. players
Hartlepool United F.C. players
Blyth Spartans A.F.C. players
Footballers from Hackney, London
Black British sportsmen
Howard Bison men's soccer players